Ermanno Roveri (5 October 1903 – 28 December 1968) was an Italian film actor. He appeared in 39 films between 1912 and 1965.

Selected filmography
 The Private Secretary (1931)
 La segretaria per tutti (1933)
 Full Speed (1934)
 The Last of the Bergeracs (1934)
 Aldebaran (1935)
 Ginevra degli Almieri (1935)
 The Man Who Smiles (1936)
 King of Diamonds (1936)
Music in the Square (1936)
 The Fornaretto of Venice (1939)
 Backstage (1939)
 Two Million for a Smile (1939)

Bibliography
John Holmstrom, The Moving Picture Boy: An International Encyclopaedia from 1895 to 1995, Norwich, Michael Russell, 1996, p. 22.

External links

1903 births
1968 deaths
Italian male film actors
Italian male child actors
Italian male silent film actors
Male actors from Milan
20th-century Italian male actors